Microsoft XP may refer to:

Windows XP editions, especially:
Windows XP Home and Professional Editions
Windows XP 64-Bit Edition (For Itanium processors)
Windows XP x64 Edition (For x86-64 processors)
Windows Server 2003, a product from the Windows XP era for server applications
Windows Fundamentals for Legacy PCs, a stripped-down version of Windows XP
Microsoft Office XP, released prior to Windows XP, even though XP is better known to refer to the Windows OS

See also
AMD Athlon XP, a microprocessor marketed for Windows XP to run on, hence the name.